Fo Shou (pronounced ) is a Yongchun and Wuyi Oolong tea with a light and somewhat peculiar taste.  It is also produced in Taiwan.

References
 Babelcarp on Fo Shou

Wuyi tea
Oolong tea
Chinese teas
Chinese tea grown in Fujian
Cultivars of tea grown in China